The deputy secretary of health and human services (formerly the under secretary of health, education, and welfare, 1953–1979, and the under secretary of health and human services, 1979–1990) is the chief operating officer of the United States Department of Health and Human Services. The deputy secretary oversees all operations within the Department, including overseeing Medicare, Medicaid, public health, medical research, food and drug safety, welfare, child and family services, disease prevention, Indian health, and mental health services. The current Deputy Secretary is Andrea Palm, who was confirmed by the United States Senate on May 11, 2021.

The deputy secretary is also the regulatory policy officer for the department, overseeing the development and approval of all HHS regulations and significant guidance. In addition, the deputy secretary leads a number of initiatives at the department, including implementing the President's management agenda, combating bio-terrorism, and public health emergency preparedness. He also represents the secretary of health and human services on the board of the John F. Kennedy Center for the Performing Arts.

The deputy secretary is appointed by the President and confirmed by the Senate. The deputy secretary is paid at level II of the Executive Schedule. The deputy secretary is assisted by a principal associate deputy secretary of health and human services, two associate deputy secretaries, and three staff assistants. The position of deputy secretary was originally held by an under secretary until the position was retitled in August 1990. The position of under secretary had been in existence since the creation of the Department of Health, Education, and Welfare in 1953.

List

Assistant secretary of health, education, and welfare

Under secretaries of health, education, and welfare

Under secretaries of health and human services

Deputy secretaries of health and human services

References

Sources

 
 
 

United States Department of Health and Human Services
Health and Human Services